Murder at the Cabaret is a 1936 British crime film directed by Reginald Fogwell and starring Phyllis Robins, Freddie Forbes, James Carew and Frederick Peisley. It was also released under the title Cabaret Murder.

Premise
A nightclub singer is murdered.

Cast
 Phyllis Robins - Jean
 Freddie Forbes - Freddie
 James Carew - Husband
 Frederick Peisley - Jimmie
 Kenneth Warrington - Toni
 Peggy Crawford - Wife

References

External links

1936 films
1936 crime films
1930s English-language films
Films directed by Reginald Fogwell
British black-and-white films
British crime films
1930s British films